Prienai entertainment and sports arena is a multifunctional arena in Prienai. First official basketball game and arena opening took place on November 4, 2011, when Rūdupis defeated Techasas with result 81:56. It is also the home to Lithuanian basketball club BC Vytautas.

References

Indoor arenas in Lithuania
Basketball venues in Lithuania
Prienai
Sport in Prienai
Buildings and structures in Kaunas County